Gustaf Van Roosbroeck (born 16 May 1948 in Hulshout) is a retired Belgian professional road bicycle racer who competed in the 1970s.

He finished fifth in the 1974 Amstel Gold Race.

Major results

1969
1st Stages 2 & 3 Olympia's Tour
1971
1st Stage 5 Tour of Belgium
1st Scheldeprijs
1972
1st Kuurne–Brussels–Kuurne
1st Grand Prix de Denain
1st Stage 2 Grand Prix de Fourmies
1st Nationale Sluitingsprijs
6th Paris–Roubaix
1973
1st Stage 3 Giro d'Italia
1st Nationale Sluitingsprijs
1st Stage 7 Tour de Suisse
1st Trofeo Luis Puig
1st Prologue Tour of Belgium (TTT)
1974
1st Stage 5 Tour de Romandie
1st Flèche Hesbignonne
2nd Züri-Metzgete
3rd Le Samyn
1975
7th Tour of Flanders
1978
1st Nokere Koerse
2nd GP Jef Scherens
3rd Züri-Metzgete
3rd Grand Prix de Denain
1979
1st Dwars door Vlaanderen
1st Overall Three Days of De Panne
2nd Circuit de Wallonie
1980
2nd Overall Three Days of De Panne
1st Stage 1

External links

References

1948 births
Living people
Belgian male cyclists
People from Hulshout
Cyclists from Antwerp Province
Tour de Suisse stage winners